The 1998–99 Welsh Premier Division was a rugby union competition for Welsh clubs. It was not contested by Cardiff and Swansea, due to their ongoing dispute with the WRU. Newport and Aberavon were promoted to take their place. Llanelli RFC won the league, despite Pontypridd RFC beginning the season as runaway favourites. Llanelli, Pontypridd, and Neath RFC qualified for the 1999–2000 Heineken Cup, with Ebbw Vale RFC missing out to make space for Cardiff and Swansea. Aberavon RFC were relegated.

The league operated under a round-robin, with each team playing the seven others home and away. The top and bottom four then separated for the second phase, again playing each other home and away to add an extra six games to the season.

Table

Results

First phase

Round 3

Round 4

Round 5

Round 6

Round 7

Round 13

Top four playoff

Round 16

Round 19

References

1998–99 rugby union tournaments for clubs
1998–99 in Welsh rugby union